Liu Xiaomeng (born 1954/1955) is a Chinese billionaire from Nanjing, who co-founded Suning Appliance in 1990.

In 2014, at age 59, The Daily Telegraph declared that Xiaomeng was one of the world's five self-made women billionaires.

Liu Xiaomeng lives in Nanjing, China.

References

1950s births
Living people
Year of birth uncertain
Billionaires from Jiangsu
Female billionaires
Businesspeople from Nanjing
21st-century Chinese women
21st-century Chinese people
Chinese women company founders
Businesspeople in electronics